The Chery A5 is a compact car produced by the Chinese manufacturer Chery from 2006 to 2010. This car heavily resembles the third-generation Nissan Altima, despite being unrelated. A facelifted variant of the A5 called the Cowin 3 was produced from 2010 to 2013.

Specifications
The car is available with three engine options: a 1.6-litre engine, a 1.8-litre engine or a 2.0-litre engine. A hybrid version, named Chery A5ISG or A5BSG, is also produced. It is considered to be the first Chinese-designed mass-production hybrid vehicle. It is equipped with safety features such as ABS, EBD and ESP.

Powertrain
All engines are ACTECO engines, designed in cooperation with the AVL engineering company, of Austria:
 1.6 L (1,597 cc) maximum power: , maximum torque: , top speed: 180 km/h, fuel consumption at 90 km/h: 
 1.8 L (1,845 cc) maximum power: , maximum torque: , top speed: 185 km/h, fuel consumption at 90 km/h: 
 2.0 L (1,971 cc) maximum power: , maximum torque: , top speed with manual transmission: 230  km/h, top speed with automatic transmission: 180 km/h, fuel consumption at 90 km/h:

Gallery

References

External links
Official Chery A5 website

A5
Compact cars
Sedans
Cars introduced in 2006
Hybrid electric cars
2010s cars